FC Saturn Naberezhnye Chelny was a Russian football team from Naberezhnye Chelny. It played professionally in the Russian Second Division for one season in 2005, when it came in the last, 19th place in the Ural-Povolzhye Zone and was relegated back to amateur levels.

External links
  Team history by footballfacts

Association football clubs established in 2001
Association football clubs established in 2006
Defunct football clubs in Russia
Sport in Naberezhnye Chelny
2001 establishments in Russia
2006 establishments in Russia